Federal Service is a term applied to United States National Guard members and units when called to active duty to serve the federal government under Article I, Section 8 and Article II, Section 2 of the Constitution and the US Code, title 10 (Department of Defense), sections 12401 to 12408.

See also
 National service
 Starship Troopers Federal Service

References

National Guard (United States)
United States Army National Guard
United States Air National Guard